In general relativity and tensor calculus, the contracted Bianchi identities are:

where  is the Ricci tensor,  the scalar curvature, and  indicates covariant differentiation.

These identities are named after Luigi Bianchi, although they had been already derived by Aurel Voss in 1880. In the Einstein field equations, the contracted Bianchi identity ensures consistency with the vanishing divergence of the matter stress–energy tensor.

Proof
Start with the Bianchi identity

Contract both sides of the above equation with a pair of metric tensors:

The first term on the left contracts to yield a Ricci scalar, while the third term contracts to yield a mixed Ricci tensor,

The last two terms are the same (changing dummy index n to m) and can be combined into a single term which shall be moved to the right,

which is the same as

Swapping the index labels l and m yields

See also
 Bianchi identities
 Einstein tensor
 Einstein field equations
 General theory of relativity
 Ricci calculus
 Tensor calculus
 Riemann curvature tensor

Notes

References

 
 
 
 

Concepts in physics
Tensors
General relativity